Let's Get It Started is the second studio album, and first major-label debut, by hip hop artist MC Hammer. It was released via Capitol Records and EMI Records on September 28, 1988. The album was produced by Hammer and Felton Pilate.

Let's Get It Started went double platinum. "Pump It Up", "Let's Get It Started", "Turn This Mutha Out" and "They Put Me in the Mix" were the most popular tracks from the album. Music videos were also produced for all of these songs. The album topped the Hot R&B chart, and peaked at No. 30 on the Billboard 200. It was No. 1 on the Top R&B chart in the U.S.

The album produced several Top 5 hits. "Turn This Mutha Out" peaked the highest at No. 3 on the US Rap charts, and also cracked the Top 15 at No. 12 on both the Dance and R&B charts. However, none of the singles made much of a dent in the pop charts.

Album overview 
Once signed to Capitol Records, Hammer re-issued his first record (a revised version of Feel My Power) with additional tracks added and sold over 2 million copies. Recorded between 1987 and 1988, it was released on September 28, 1988. "Pump It Up", "Turn This Mutha Out", "Let's Get It Started" and "They Put Me in the Mix" were released as singles from the album, which all charted.

Not quite satisfied with the multi-platinum success, Hammer's music underwent a metamorphosis, shifting from the standard rap format in his upcoming album. According to Hammer: "I decided the next album would be more musical." Purists chastised him for being more dancer than rapper. Sitting in a leopard-print bodysuit before a concert, he defended his style: "People were ready for something different from the traditional rap style. The fact that the record has reached this level indicates the genre is growing."

"Turn This Mutha Out" samples George Clinton's "Give Up the Funk (Tear the Roof off the Sucker)", as well as the Incredible Bongo Band's "Apache".

Legacy and impact 
The popular "Turn This Mutha Out" peaked at No. 3 on the US Rap charts, and cracked the Top 15 at No. 12 on both the Dance Club and R&B/Hip-Hop charts. In 1989, the song was nominated for a MTV Video Music Award for Best Rap Video. M.C. Hammer was good friends with Arsenio Hall, and therefore was invited to perform on The Arsenio Hall Show in 1989, prior to the release of Please Hammer Don't Hurt 'Em. With the success of that album, Feel My Power and Let's Get It Started received more attention.

Music videos were produced for "Ring 'Em/Pump It Up (Here's The News)", "Let's Get It Started", "They Put Me in the Mix" (later remixed) and "Turn This Mutha Out". Hammer used some of the proceeds from this album to install a rolling recording studio in the back of his tour bus, where he recorded much of his second album. "Turn This Mutha Out" is also featured on the MTV Party to Go 1 album. Hammer performed "Pump it Up" during Showtime at the Apollo on September 16, 1989.

In January 1990, Hammer won two American Music Awards for Let's Get It Started: Favorite Rap/Hip-Hop Artist and Favorite Rap/Hip-Hop Album. It was also nominated for Favorite Soul/R&B Album.

The single "Let's Get it Started" became the record that began the now-legendary rivalry between Hammer and LL Cool J. In the song's lyrics, Hammer braggadociously stated that he is second to none, in comparison to other rappers: "And when it comes to straight up rockin’ / I’m second to none / from Doug E. Fresh to LL or DJ Run." LL Cool J would later respond with "To da Break of Dawn", and revisit the rivalry years later with "I Shot Ya (remix)".

Track listing 
 "Intro: Turn This Mutha Out" (Explicit) 2:38
 "Let's Get It Started (Radio Edit)" 4:08
 "Ring 'Em" 4:20
 "Cold Go MC Hammer" 4:05
 "You're Being Served" 4:45
 "It's Gone (Edit)" 3:56
 "(Hammer Hammer) They Put Me in the Mix (Edit)" 3:28
 "Son of the King" 3:53
 "That's What I Said" 3:38
 "Feel My Power" 3:07
 "Pump It Up (Here's the News) (Radio Edit)" 4:35

Length: 42:33

Samples used 
"Let's Get It Started"
 "Change The Beat" by Fab Five Freddy
 "Another One Bites the Dust" by Queen
 "Rock Box" by Run-DMC
 "Rock The Bells" by LL Cool J
 "Give It to Me Baby" by Rick James

"Pump It Up" 
 "The Champ" by the Mohawks
 "Hot Pants" by James Brown
 "Al-Naafiysh (The Soul)" by Hashim
 "The Big Beat" by Billy Squier
 		
"Turn This Mutha Out"
 "Apache" by Incredible Bongo Band
 "Give Up the Funk (Tear the Roof Off the Sucker)" by Parliament.
 "Rocket in the Pocket (live)" by Cerrone

"They Put Me in the Mix"
"Get Up (I Feel Like Being a) Sex Machine" by James Brown
"Change the Beat" by Fab 5 Freddy
"D'Ya Like Scratchin'?" by Malcolm McLaren and World's Famous Supreme Team
"Housequake" by Prince

See also 
List of number-one R&B albums of 1989 (U.S.)

Charts

Weekly charts

Year-end charts

Certifications

References 

1988 albums
MC Hammer albums
Capitol Records albums
EMI Records albums